Andrew David Davies (born 5 May 1952) is a Welsh Labour politician, who represented the constituency of Swansea West in the National Assembly for Wales. Davies was born in Hereford to Welsh parents; his mother is from Llandeilo and his father from Holywell, Flintshire. Davies attended Hereford Cathedral School and Swansea University, where he trained as a teacher.

Professional career
He worked for the Ford Motor Company and a public affairs company. Davies is also a qualified counsellor and has lectured in further, higher and continuing education.

Political career
Former Chair of Swansea West Labour Party and member of the Welsh Labour Executive Committee, he was a regional party official from 1984 to 1991. Davies was one of the architects of devolution as main organiser of the Labour Party Yes Campaign in 1997. He has served as a member of the Welsh Assembly Government for the first ten years of devolution serving under both Alun Michael and Rhodri Morgan.

From May 1999 to February 2002, he served as Business Manager with a place on the Business Committee. During the period of Labour minority government (May 1999-October 2000), he also served as chief whip of the Labour group, but Standing Orders of the Labour Group prohibited him holding this post during a coalition period.

In February 2002, promotion followed the "tweak" by Rhodri Morgan to his Cabinet when, with Mike German AM still outside Government, Andrew Davies was promoted to Minister for Economic Development. It is arguably the second most senior position in Cabinet and was seen as a reward for loyalty and for managing Assembly business.

In the May 2003 reshuffle he also gained responsibility for transport policy. He helped the Assembly's policy of extending broadband connectivity throughout Wales to progress. From 2000 he has also had personal responsibility for co-ordination of information technology in public institutions, and has sought to advance Wales's IT abilities on a European level.

In May 2007 Davies became Minister for Social Justice and Public Service delivery in the Labour led minority government. In the coalition government of Labour and Plaid Cymru, Davies was appointed Minister for Finance and Public Service Delivery on 19 July. 

He left the cabinet following the Welsh Labour leadership election in 2009 and stood down as an Assembly Member at the 2011 election.

He later became Chairman of Abertawe Bro Morgannwg University Health Board in South Wales from 2013 until 2019.

References

External links
 Bio at the Welsh Assembly Government
 The Department for Enterprise, Innovation, and Networks
 Assembly Handbook (pdf)

1952 births
Living people
People from Hereford
People educated at Hereford Cathedral School
Alumni of Swansea University
Welsh Labour members of the Senedd
Politicians from Swansea
Wales AMs 1999–2003
Wales AMs 2003–2007
Wales AMs 2007–2011
Members of the Welsh Assembly Government
Ministers for Finance of Wales
Commanders of the Order of the British Empire
English people of Welsh descent